Danny Mack Gable (born October 25, 1948) is an American former freestyle and freestyle wrestler and coach. Considered to be one of the greatest wrestlers of all time, Gable is a two-time NCAA Division I national champion, a world gold medalist, and an Olympic gold medalist. Gable was only the third wrestler to have ever been inducted into the United World Wrestling's Hall of Fame in the Legend category. On December 8, 2020, U.S. President Donald Trump awarded Gable with the Presidential Medal of Freedom.

Early life
Gable was born and grew up in Waterloo, Iowa. When he was 15 years old, a teenager from his neighborhood raped and murdered Gable's 19-year-old sister. Although Gable has called his sister's death his "biggest loss," he did not allow the tragedy to affect his focus on wrestling. Instead, he thought of it as a reason to train with even more determination:

He attended high school at West High School in Waterloo.

Wrestling career

College
From 1967 to 1970, Gable attended Iowa State University, where he competed in wrestling. At Iowa State, he became an NCAA Division I national runner-up and two-time national champion. Gable's college career record was 117–1, with his only loss being in the final match of his final season to Larry Owings of the University of Washington.

Freestyle
From 1971 to 1973, Gable competed internationally in freestyle wrestling. Highlights of his career include gold medals at the 1971 Tbilisi Tournament, the 1971 world championships, and the 1972 Olympic Games. At the 1972 Games, in particular, Gable won all six of his matches without giving up a point. After competing sporadically from 1974 to 1975, Gable retired and became a full-time coach. In 1991, Gable was awarded with the Art Abrams Lifetime Achievement Award by Cauliflower Alley Club.

Match results

! colspan="7"|World Championships & Olympic Games Matches
|-
!  Res.
!  Record
!  Opponent
!  Score
!  Date
!  Event
!  Location
|-
! style=background:white colspan=7 |
|-
|Win
|12–0
|align=left| Ruslan Ashuraliyev
|style="font-size:88%"|3–0
|style="font-size:88%" rowspan=6|August 27, 1972
|style="font-size:88%" rowspan=6|1972 Summer Olympic Games
|style="text-align:left;font-size:88%;" rowspan=6| Munich, West Germany
|-
|Win
|11–0
|align=left| Włodzimierz Cieślak
|style="font-size:88%"|Fall
|-
|Win
|10–0
|align=left| Kikuo Wada
|style="font-size:88%"|6–0
|-
|Win
|9–0
|align=left| Stefanos Ioannidis
|style="font-size:88%"|Fall
|-
|Win
|8–0
|align=left| Klaus Rost
|style="font-size:88%"|20–0
|-
|Win
|7–0
|align=left| Safer Sali
|style="font-size:88%"|Fall
|-
! style=background:white colspan=7 |
|-
|Win
|6–0
|align=left| Ismail Yuseinov
|style="font-size:88%"|8–3
|style="font-size:88%" rowspan=6|August 27, 1971
|style="font-size:88%" rowspan=6|1971 World Wrestling Championships
|style="text-align:left;font-size:88%;" rowspan=6| Sofia, Bulgaria
|-
|Win
|5–0
|align=left| Kikuo Wada
|style="font-size:88%"|Fall
|-
|Win
|4–0
|align=left| Josef Engel
|style="font-size:88%"|Fall
|-
|Win
|3–0
|align=left| Nihat Kabanli
|style="font-size:88%"|Fall
|-
|Win
|2–0
|align=left| Eero Suvilehto
|style="font-size:88%"|Fall
|-
|Win
|1–0
|align=left| Vasily Kazakov
|style="font-size:88%"|5–1

Coaching career
From 1976 to 1997, Gable was the head wrestling coach at the University of Iowa. Gable's teams compiled a dual meet record of 355–21–5. He coached 152 All-Americans, 45 national champions, 106 Big Ten champions, and 12 Olympians, including eight medalists. His teams won 21 Big Ten championships and 15 NCAA Division I titles.

In addition to coaching folkstyle wrestling at the University of Iowa, Gable coached freestyle wrestling. Gable was the head coach of three Olympic teams and six world teams.

Awards and honors

2020
  Presidential Medal of Freedom

1980
National Wrestling Hall of Fame Distinguished Member

1972
 Summer Olympics
 Tbilisi Tournament
 Midlands Championships

1971
 World Wrestling Championships
 Pan American Games
 Midlands Championships

1970
 NCAA Division I
NCAA Division I Gorrarian Award winner
 Big Eight Conference
 Midlands Championships

1969
 NCAA Division I
NCAA Division I Gorrarian Award winner
 Big Eight Conference
 Midlands Championships

1968
 NCAA Division I
 Big Eight Conference
 Midlands Championships

1967
 Midlands Championships

Legacy
Olympic gold medalist freestyle wrestler Gable Steveson was named after him.

Gable has been written about in many magazines and numerous books, including Two Guys Named Dan (1976), From Gotch to Gable: A History of Wrestling in Iowa (1981), The Toughest Men in Sports (1984) and Legends of the Mat (2006), all by wrestling historian Mike Chapman. 

He also has a museum named for him in his hometown of Waterloo, Iowa, part of the National Wrestling Hall of Fame and Museum.

See also

 Iowa Sports Hall of Fame

Bibliography
Baughman, Wayne. 1987. Wrestling On & Off the Mat. R. Wayne Baughman. 
Chen, Albert. 2014.  "Where are they Now: Catching up with Dan Gable and Larry Owings," Sports Illustrated (July 11, 2014)
Gable, Dan. 2015. A Wrestling Life: The Inspiring Stories of Dan Gable.  University of Iowa Press. 
Hammond, Jairus K. 2005. The History of Collegiate Wrestling. National Wrestling Hall of Fame and Museum.  
Moffat, James V. 2007. Wrestlers At The Trials. Exit Zero Publishing. 
Smith, Russ L. 1973. The Legend of Dan Gable. Medalist Sports Education Publication.
Zavoral, Nolan. 1997. A Season on the Mat. Simon & Schuster.

References

External links

 Official site
 
 
 Gable's wins and losses between the years 1963 and 1973
 
 
 
 

1948 births
Living people
Wrestlers at the 1972 Summer Olympics
American male sport wrestlers
American wrestling coaches
Iowa State Cyclones wrestlers
Iowa Hawkeyes wrestling coaches
Sportspeople from Waterloo, Iowa
Olympic gold medalists for the United States in wrestling
World Wrestling Championships medalists
Medalists at the 1972 Summer Olympics
Pan American Games medalists in wrestling
Pan American Games gold medalists for the United States
Wrestlers at the 1971 Pan American Games
Presidential Medal of Freedom recipients
Medalists at the 1971 Pan American Games
20th-century American people
21st-century American people